The National Archives (TNA) is a non-ministerial department of the Government of the United Kingdom. Its parent department is the Department for Digital, Culture, Media and Sport of the United Kingdom of Great Britain and Northern Ireland. It is the official archive of the UK Government and for England and Wales; and "guardian of some of the nation's most iconic documents, dating back more than 1,000 years." There are separate national archives for Scotland (the National Records of Scotland) and Northern Ireland (the Public Record Office of Northern Ireland).

TNA was formerly four separate organisations: the Public Record Office (PRO), the Historical Manuscripts Commission, the Office of Public Sector Information (OPSI) and His Majesty's Stationery Office (HMSO). The Public Record Office still exists as a legal entity, as the enabling legislation has not been modified, and documents held by the institution thus continue to be cited by many scholars as part of the PRO. Since 2008, TNA has also hosted the former UK Statute Law Database, now known as legislation.gov.uk.

It is institutional policy to include the definite article, with an initial capital letter, in its name (hence "The National Archives", abbreviated as TNA) but this practice is not always followed in the nonspecialist media.

The department is the responsibility of the Parliamentary Under Secretary of State for Arts, Heritage and Tourism; a minister in His Majesty's Government.

Location
The National Archives is based in Kew in the London Borough of Richmond upon Thames in south-west London. The building was opened in 1977 as an additional home for the public records, which were held in a building on Chancery Lane. The site was originally a World War I hospital, which was later used by several government departments. It is near to Kew Gardens Underground station.

Until its closure in March 2008, the Family Records Centre in Islington was run jointly by The National Archives and the General Register Office. The National Archives has an additional office in Norwich, which is primarily for former OPSI staff.  There is also an additional record storage facility (DeepStore) in the worked-out parts of Winsford Rock Salt Mine, Winsford, Cheshire.

History

The National Archives was created in 2003 by combining the Public Record Office and the Historical Manuscripts Commission and is a non-ministerial department reporting to the Minister of State for digital policy.

On 31 October 2006, The National Archives merged with the Office of Public Sector Information (OPSI), which itself also contained His Majesty's Stationery Office (HMSO) which was previously a part of the Cabinet Office. The name remained The National Archives.

Chief Executive and Keeper
1991–2005: Sarah Tyacke
2005–2010: Natalie Ceeney
2010–2013: Oliver Morley
2013–2014: Clem Brohier (acting)
2014–present: Jeff James

Key roles

TNA claims it is "at the heart of information policy—setting standards and supporting innovation in information and records management across the UK, and providing a practical framework of best practice for opening up and encouraging the re-use of public sector information. This work helps inform today's decisions and ensure that they become tomorrow's permanent record."
It has a number of key roles in information policy:
 Policy – advising government on information practice and policy, on issues from record creation through to its reuse
 Selection – selecting which documents to store
 Preservation – ensuring the documents remain in as good a condition as possible
 Access – providing the public with the opportunity to view the documents
 Advice – advising the public and other archives and archivists around the world on how to care for documents
 Intellectual property management – TNA (via OPSI and HMSO) manages crown copyright for the UK
 Regulation – ensuring that other public sector organisations adhere to both the public records act and the PSI reuse regulations.

Sector leadership
The National Archives (and before it the Public Record Office) has long had a role of oversight and leadership for the entire archives sector and archives profession in the UK, including local government and non-governmental archives. Under the Public Records Act 1958 it is responsible for overseeing the appropriate custody of certain non-governmental public records in England and Wales. Under the 2003 Historical Manuscripts Commission Warrant it has responsibility for investigating and reporting on non-governmental records and archives of all kinds throughout the United Kingdom. In October 2011, when the Museums, Libraries and Archives Council was wound up, TNA took over its responsibilities in respect of archives in England, including providing information and advice to ministers on archives policy. The National Archives now sees this part of its role as being "to enhance the 'archival health of the nation'".

Collections

Types of records

The National Archives is His Majesty's Government's official archive, "containing 1000 years of history from Domesday Book to the present", with records from parchment and paper scrolls through to digital files and archived websites. The material held at Kew includes the following:

Documents from the central courts of law from the twelfth century onwards, including the  Court of King's Bench, the Court of Common Pleas, the Court of Chancery, the Court of Exchequer, the Supreme Court of Judicature, the Central Criminal Court, Assizes, and many other courts
Medieval, early modern and modern records of central government
A large and disparate collection of maps, plans and architectural drawings
Records for family historians including wills, naturalisation certificates and criminal records
Service and operational records of the armed forces War Office, Admiralty etc.
Foreign Office and Colonial Office correspondence and files
Cabinet papers and Home Office records
Statistics of the Board of Trade
 The surviving records of (mainly) the English railway companies, transferred from the British Railways Record Office

There is also a museum, which displays key documents such as Domesday Book and has exhibitions on various topics using material from the collections.

Access to documents

The collections held by the National Archives can be searched using their online catalogue.

Entrance to The National Archives is free. Anybody aged 16 or over can access the original documents at the Kew site, after producing two acceptable proofs of identity and being issued a free reader's ticket.

The reading room has terminals from which documents can be ordered up from secure storage areas by their reference number. The reference number is composed of three sections: the department code of up to four letters, such as WO for the War Office; a series or class number, for the "subcategory" or collection that the document comes from; and an individual document number. Documents can also be ordered in advance.

Once a document has been ordered, The National Archives aims to get it to the reader within 45 minutes (assuming it is kept at Kew rather than at their second repository, "Deep Store" – a former salt mine in Cheshire: it can take 2–3 days for files to be retrieved from the latter). Special arrangements are in place for readers wishing to retrieve large groups of files.

A reader's ticket is not needed to access records on microform or online. Frequently accessed documents such as the Abdication Papers have been put on microfilm, as have records for two million First World War soldiers. The originals of the latter were stored in a warehouse in London along with four million others, but incendiary bombs dropped on the warehouse in the Second World War started a fire in which most were destroyed. The surviving third were largely water or fire-damaged and thus acquired the colloquial name of the "Burnt Documents." Because they were mostly too fragile for public access, they were put on microfilm with the aid of the Heritage Lottery Fund. They have now also been digitised and are available on the Ancestry website.

Some of the most popular documents have now been digitised and are available to download from Discovery, for a fee of £3.50 per file, 
or through co-branded services called licensed Internet associates (LIA) as pay per view or part of their subscription service.
A list of records online is available under the  records, catalogues and online records menu on The National Archives' website.

All of the open census records have been digitised, and there are also significant other sources online, such as wills proved in the Prerogative Court of Canterbury, 1383–1858. Researchers are  encouraged to check the online services first, to see if they can get what they want online. If a document is available online, The National Archives' policy is to encourage people to use the digital copy and not the original, even if they come to Kew, in order to protect the original from damage.

Storage

The documents are stored on mobile shelving – double-sided shelves, which are pushed together so that there is no aisle between them. A large handle on the end of each shelf allows them to be moved along tracks in the floor to create an aisle when needed.

They are generally stored in acid-free folders or boxes.

In the event of a fire The National Archives would be clearly unable to use sprinklers for fear of ruining its holdings, and so when the building is evacuated, argon gas is released into the air-tight repositories.

Other services
The National Archives also provides services to help users in their research and also find collections beyond those it holds.

Education

The National Archives' education web page is a free online resource for teaching and learning history, aimed at teachers and students. Users can select time periods they are interested in, from the medieval era to the present day. Each time period contains sub-topics with various materials that can be used as teaching tools for teachers. Resources for students focus primarily on tips for research and writing using archival materials.

"Access to Archives"
Access to Archives (also known as A2A) is a database containing details of archival collections held in many different archive repositories in England and Wales. As of March 2008, there are no more plans to add additional collections to A2A due to lack of funding from the Heritage Lottery Fund and the changing financial priorities of The National Archives, but existing entries can still be updated. The A2A database was transferred to The National Archives with a new platform with a simpler interface to ensure its availability.

National Register of Archives

The National Register of Archives (NRA) is the central point for the collection and circulation of information about the content and nature of archival manuscripts relating to British history. It contains published and unpublished lists and catalogues describing archival collections in the UK and overseas: currently over 44,000 such catalogues are included. The register can be consulted in the National Archives reading room and the index used to be searchable as an online database on the National Archives web site.

The information is collected in a variety of ways. TNA is sent hard-copy catalogues from archive repositories holding records relating to British history. These are kept in the reading room at The National Archives and indexed in the online database. TNA conducts an annual survey of archive repositories and records all new accessions, and the accession lists are also available on TNA's website. Information is also obtained from surveys and guides to archival collections, and other publications.

The Register includes name indexes to its contents (covering corporate names, personal names, family names, and place names); but not subject or thematic indexes. Where the catalogues are themselves available online the indexes provide direct electronic links; but many still exist in hard copy only (often as unpublished "grey literature"), and it remains necessary for the researcher to visit either TNA or the specific repository in order to consult them.

A separate National Register of Archives for Scotland is maintained at the National Archives of Scotland, but its contents are duplicated within the NRA at Kew.

ARCHON directory
ARCHON Directory is a database of contact details for archive repositories in the UK and institutions elsewhere in the world which have substantial collections of manuscripts relating to British history.

"Your Archives"
Your Archives is a wiki for the National Archives on-line community which was launched in May 2007; it was closed for editing on 30 September 2012 in preparation of archiving on the Government web archive. The contributions are made by users to give additional information to that which is available on the other services provided by the National Archives, including the catalogue, research guides, documentonline and National Register of Archive. Your Archives encourages users to create articles not only about historical records held by the National Archives, but those held in other archive repositories.

Databases
The National Archives also hosts several databases on types of records including hospital records; migration records; and manorial records.

Working with the Wellcome Library, TNA has made hospital records available via the Hospital Records Database. The Hospital Records Database has not been updated since 2012, and there are no current updates occurring as of 2018.

The Manorial Documents Register includes records relating to manors located in England and Wales. Digitization of the records is on-going as of 2018.

Civil Pages
The National Archives operates the Civil Pages project on behalf of the Cabinet Office, operating as an online directory for the civil service, facilitating working together and providing a means of sharing knowledge securely between government departments.

Smartphone applications

In January 2011 The National Archives, in conjunction with historian Nick Barratt and smartphone applications development studio RevelMob, developed its first Old Money iPhone app, which uses historic price data from documents held at The National Archives to see what a sum of money from the past (from 1270) would be worth today and the spending power it would have commanded at the time.

In September 2011, TNA's museum began using QRpedia codes, which can be scanned by smartphone users in order to retrieve information about exhibits from Wikipedia.

Blogs and podcasts 
TNA regularly posts blogs to its website. Posts cover a wide range of topics, from specific events and time periods to features on holdings in TNA, as well as information on the archive's operations.

The "Archives Media Player" section holds videos and podcasts created and posted by TNA. Videos and audio are not posted as regularly as TNA's blog.

The Future: Archives Inspire 2015–19

Archives Inspire is a strategy document that sets out the goals and priorities of the organisation over four years, from 2015 onwards.

Forgeries discovered in 2005

In June 2005, journalist Ben Fenton of The Daily Telegraph received an email from a colleague asking him to investigate documents held at TNA that alleged that a British intelligence agent had, on the orders of Winston Churchill, murdered Heinrich Himmler, the head of the Nazi SS, in 1945. The three documents had come to prominence after being revealed by author Martin Allen in his book Himmler's Secret War.

On viewing photographs of the documents, Fenton's suspicions were immediately aroused by the fact that such a controversial policy was casually committed to paper, even to the extent of naming the assassin, and by the use of colourful language. Viewing the original documents the next day, Fenton spotted what looked like pencil marks beneath the signature on one of them. This confirmed his suspicions and, along with his experience of analysing historic documents, it enabled him to persuade The Daily Telegraph to pay for forensic analysis.

TNA staff took four files, along with authenticated copies of the authors' handwriting, to Dr Audrey Giles, a former head of Scotland Yard's Questioned Documents Unit, who confirmed that the documents were forgeries. One letter head had been printed on a laser printer and all had tear marks where they had been threaded on to the security tags. Further investigations by TNA staff revealed that the counterfeit documents contained errors, breaches of protocol and etiquette which their supposed authors would not have committed.

After his account of the deception appeared in the newspaper, Fenton was contacted by a German academic, Ernst Haiger, who informed him of his own suspicions over other TNA documents cited in an earlier Allen book. Examination by TNA experts led to more than a dozen documents being identified as suspicious and submitted to Home Office specialists for examination. When they, too, were declared forgeries, the TNA called in the police.

In the addendum to the later American edition of the book (which acknowledged that the papers were forged), Allen theorised that, some time after he saw the documents, they had been removed and replaced with clumsily forged replicas, to cast doubt upon his discoveries.

In all, twenty-nine forged documents were discovered, each typed on one of only four typewriters. They were placed in twelve separate files, and cited at least once in one or more of Allen's three books. According to the experts at TNA, documents now shown to be forgeries supported controversial arguments central to each of Allen's books: in Hidden Agenda, five documents now known to be forged helped justify his claim that the Duke of Windsor betrayed military secrets to Hitler; in The Hitler/Hess Deception, thirteen forged papers supported Allen's contention that, in 1941, British intelligence used members of the Royal Family to fool the Nazis into thinking Britain was on the verge of a pro-German putsch; in Himmler's Secret War, twenty-two counterfeit papers also underpinned the book's core claims that British intelligence played mind games with Himmler to encourage him to betray Hitler from 1943 onwards, and that ultimately they murdered the SS chief.

In 2007 the Crown Prosecution Service announced that it was "not in the public interest" to prosecute the only suspect questioned by police. Allen's health problems had prevented the police questioning him for nine months, after which he told them he was wholly innocent. In a December 2007 response to questions from Norman Baker MP, the Solicitor-General said that the police investigation, guided by the opinion of a senior barrister, had produced "sufficient evidence for a realistic prospect of conviction" on charges of forgery, using a forged document and criminal damage but it had been decided that it was not in the public interest to proceed. In reaching that decision, "matters relating to Mr Allen's health and the surrounding circumstances were significant in deciding that a prosecution was not in the public interest".

Lost and misplaced records 
Between 2005 and 2011, over 1500 files had been reported missing from the archives. Notable items reported missing during this period included correspondence from Winston Churchill and documents from the courts of several monarchies. Around 800 of these records have since been recovered, and the archives has reported that they believe most are misplaced rather than permanently lost. In 2017, the archives again received attention when it was reported that around 1000 files had been removed – in part or whole – by government officials and reported as missing when not returned. In response to concerns stated by politicians and historians about management of the collection, the archives stressed that the number of missing files is quite small in proportion the entire holdings of the repository – about 0.01% – and that, as of 2017, its loss rate was only around 100 documents, annually.

MI5 records at TNA 
TNA receives records from MI5 around twice a year. Some information in records—or records themselves—are withheld at the discretion of MI5.

MI5 records in the news 
MI5 records relating to British Prime Minister Margaret Thatcher's time in office have caused some questions and controversy regarding the transparency of the British government. In 2017, journalist Richard Norton-Taylor argued that MI5, and the British government by extension, was purposely withholding some information that the public deserves to know. Norton-Taylor specifically refers to Thatcher's reluctance to allow the publication of two books looking into the impact that intelligence organizations of Britain had on World War II, as well as her worries about British activities in Northern Ireland becoming known to the general public.

Additional MI5 records relating to the blacklisting of government workers during Thatcher's time in office have also prompted questions after their release. In addition to government workers, the blacklists also targeted other groups, such as unions and minorities, that may not fall in line with Conservative policies. Debates on the roles of MI5, Whitehall, and Thatcher's administration, have come up in light of these records at TNA and prompted questions of transparency as well as whether or not these blacklists had an effect on the careers of any individuals included. Questions also remain, as of 2018, whether or not there are still blacklists currently in effect and if these could affect government workers, unions, and other individuals possibly included in the blacklists.

See also 
 UK Government Web Archive
 International Standard Bibliographic Description
 List and Index Society
 List of national archives
 PRONOM technical registry

References

External links 

 
 National Records of Scotland—a separate organisation
 Public Record Office of Northern Ireland—the official repository for Northern Ireland
 Your Archives—wiki for users of The National Archives

 
2003 establishments in the United Kingdom
Archives in England
Archives in the London Borough of Richmond upon Thames
Archives in the United Kingdom
Buildings and structures on the River Thames
Executive agencies of the United Kingdom government
Kew, London
United Kingdom
Organisations based in the London Borough of Richmond upon Thames
Organisations using QRpedia
State archives
Tourist attractions in the London Borough of Richmond upon Thames
United Kingdom government information